Lawrence Hyer Boerner (January 21, 1905 – October 16, 1969) was a pitcher in Major League Baseball who played for the Boston Red Sox. Boerner batted and threw right-handed.

Boerner was signed as a free agent out of McDaniel College in 1932 by the Boston Red Sox. He debuted on June 30, 1932, and played his final game on September 24, 1932.

In his only major league season, Boerner posted a 0–4 record with a 5.02 ERA, 19 strikeouts, and 61 innings in 21 games pitched (five as a starter.

Boerner died in Staunton, Virginia, at age 64.

External links

The Baseball Page
Retrosheet

Boston Red Sox players
Major League Baseball pitchers
Baseball players from Virginia
People from Staunton, Virginia
McDaniel Green Terror baseball players
Frederick Hustlers players
1905 births
1969 deaths
Henderson Bunnies players